The ovation ( from ovare: to rejoice) was a form of the Roman triumph. Ovations were granted when war was not declared between enemies on the level of nations or states; when an enemy was considered basely inferior (e.g., slaves, pirates); or when the general conflict was resolved with little or no danger to the army itself. The Ovation could also be given rather than a triumph when there were extenuating circumstances, such as when  Marcus Marcellus was given an ovation in lieu of a triumph as his army remained in Sicily and therefore was unable to cross the pomerium.

The general celebrating the ovation did not enter the city on a biga, a chariot pulled by two white horses, as generals celebrating triumphs did, but instead rode on horseback in the toga praetexta of a magistrate.

The honoured general also wore a wreath of myrtle (sacred to Venus) upon his brow, rather than the triumphal wreath of laurel. The Roman Senate did not precede the general, nor did soldiers usually participate in the procession.

Perhaps the most famous ovation in history is that which Marcus Licinius Crassus celebrated after his victory of the Third Servile War.

Etymology
From latin ovis, sheep, because a sheep was sacrificed on the occasion.

Ovation holders

Republic
There were 23 known ovations during the Republic.
 503 BC – Publius Postumius Tubertus (over Sabins)
 487 BC – Gaius Aquillius Tuscus
 474 BC – Gnaeus Manlius Vulso
 462 BC – T. Veturius Geminus Cicurinus
 421 BC – Cn. Fabius Vibulanus
 410 BC – C. Valerius Potitus Volusus
 390 BC – Marcus Manlius Capitolinus
 360 BC – Marcus Fabius Ambustus
 290 or 289 BC – M. Curius Dentatus
 211 BC – M. Claudius Marcellus
 207 BC – Gaius Claudius Nero
 200 BC – Lucius Cornelius Lentulus
 196 BC – Cn. Cornelius Blasius
 195 BC – M. Helvius
 191 BC – Marcus Fulvius Nobilior
 185 BC – L. Manlius Acidinus Fulvianus
 182 BC – A. Terentius Varro
 174 BC – Ap. Claudius Centho
 132 BC – M. Perperna
 99 BC – M. Aquilius
 71 BC – M. Licinius Crassus
 44 BC – Julius Caesar
 40 BC – Augustus
 40 BC – Marcus Antonius
 36 BC – Augustus

Principate
 11 BC – Nero Claudius Drusus
 9 BC (approved in 11 BC) – Tiberius
 20 – Drusus Julius Caesar
 40 – Caligula
 47 – Aulus Plautius
 55 – Nero
 93 – Domitian

See also 

 Roman Triumph
 Roman triumphal honours

Notes

Military awards and decorations of ancient Rome